Cystatin-F is a protein that in humans is encoded by the CST7 gene.

The cystatin superfamily encompasses proteins that contain multiple cystatin-like sequences. Some of the members are active cysteine protease inhibitors, while others have lost or perhaps never acquired this inhibitory activity. There are three inhibitory families in the superfamily, including the type 1 cystatins (stefins), type 2 cystatins and the kininogens. The type 2 cystatin proteins are a class of cysteine proteinase inhibitors found in a variety of human fluids and secretions. This gene encodes a glycosylated cysteine protease inhibitor with a putative role in immune regulation through inhibition of a unique target in the hematopoietic system. Expression of the protein has been observed in various human cancer cell lines established from malignant tumors.

References
'

External links
 The MEROPS online database for peptidases and their inhibitors: I25.007

Further reading